An Sang-Hyun (born 5 March 1986) is a South Korean footballer who currently plays as a midfielder for Daejeon Citizen.

Club career
Born in Paju, An started his professional career in FC Seoul, then known as Anyang LG Cheetahs in 2002. In his seven-year spell with the club he only made 11 K League appearances, 10 of these coming in 2007, during Şenol Güneş' first season in charge of the club.

In July 2009, An agreed a loan move to Gyeongnam FC for the remainder of the 2009 season, and stayed on at Gyeongnam for 2010.  An proved to be a regular starter for his new club, playing 35 games in his 18-month spell.

On 25 February 2011, An joined Daegu FC. An made his Daegu FC debut on 13 March against Gangwon FC in a 1–0 home victory.

International career 
An has represented South Korea at both Under-17 and Under-20 level.  In 2003, he was part of the team that went to Finland to participate in the U-17 FIFA World Championship, and played in all three group games.

Club career statistics

References

External links 

 

1986 births
Living people
Association football forwards
South Korean footballers
FC Seoul players
Gyeongnam FC players
Daegu FC players
Daejeon Hana Citizen FC players
Seongnam FC players
K League 1 players
K League 2 players
People from Paju
Sportspeople from Gyeonggi Province